Del'Haye is a surname. Notable people with the surname include:

Karl Del'Haye (born 1955), German footballer
Pascal Del'Haye, German physicist
R. A. Del'Haye (1889–1944), Canadian World War I flying ace

See also
Delahaye (surname)